Michal Piskoř (born January 16, 1967) is a Czech former professional ice hockey forward.

Piskoř played in the Czechoslovak First Ice Hockey League and the Czech Extraliga for TJ Zetor Brno, HC Vítkovice, HC Železárny Třinec and HC Slezan Opava. He also played in the Polska Hokej Liga for GKS TychyPodhale Nowy Targ. Piskoř was also head coach of Slezan Opava from 2010 to 2012.

References

External links

1967 births
Living people
HC Bílí Tygři Liberec players
Czech ice hockey coaches
Czech ice hockey forwards
GKS Tychy (ice hockey) players
HC Kometa Brno players
HC Oceláři Třinec players
Podhale Nowy Targ players
HC Slezan Opava players
HC Tábor players
HC Vítkovice players
1. EV Weiden players
Czechoslovak ice hockey forwards
Czech expatriate ice hockey players in Germany
Czech expatriate sportspeople in Poland
Expatriate ice hockey players in Poland